The 2021–22 season was Hamilton Academical's first season back in the second tier of Scottish football, following their relegation from the Scottish Premiership at the end of the 2020–21 season. Hamilton also competed in the League Cup, Challenge Cup and the Scottish Cup.

Summary

Management
Hamilton began the season under the management of Brian Rice who had been at the club since January 2019. Rice would resign from his position after only the second game of the league season following a 1–0 loss to Greenock Morton.

Former Hamilton player and assistant manager Stuart Taylor returned to the club after being appointed as their new head coach on 20 August.

Results and fixtures

Scottish Championship

Scottish League Cup

Group stage

Scottish Challenge Cup

Scottish Cup

Squad statistics

Appearances
As of 29 April 2022

|-
|colspan="10"|Players who left the club during the 2021–22 season
|-

|}

Team statistics

League table

League Cup table

Transfers

In

Out

References

Hamilton Academical F.C. seasons
Hamilton Academical